The year 1682 in science and technology involved some significant events.

Astronomy
 A comet is observed, which later becomes known as Comet Halley, after Edmund Halley successfully predicts its return in 1758.

Discoveries
 Antony Van Leeuwenhoek discovers the banded pattern of muscle fibers.

Botany
 John Ray publishes his Methodus plantarum nova, which sets out his system to divide flowering plants into monocotyledons and dicotyledons.

Exploration
 René Robert Cavelier, Sieur de La Salle canoes down the Mississippi River, naming the Mississippi basin Louisiana in honour of Louis XIV.

Medicine
 English naval surgeon James Yonge (1646–1721) publishes Wounds of the Brain Proved Curable, probably the first monograph in English on surgery of the head.

Births
 February 4 – Johann Friedrich Böttger, German alchemist and developer of porcelain manufacture (died 1719)
 February 25 – Giovanni Battista Morgagni, Italian anatomist (died 1771)
 March 24 – Mark Catesby, English naturalist (died 1749)
 April 16 – John Hadley, English mathematician (died 1744)
 July 10 – Roger Cotes, English mathematician (died 1716)

Deaths
 July 12 – Jean Picard, French astronomer (born 1620)
 October – J. J. Becher, German physician and chemist (born 1635)

 
17th century in science
1680s in science